Oklahoma City Alliance were a soccer club based in Oklahoma City, Oklahoma that competed in the USISL.

For the 1997/98 season, the team was renamed the Oklahoma City Warriors.

Year-by-year

A
Defunct soccer clubs in Oklahoma
Association football clubs established in 1996
Association football clubs disestablished in 1998
1996 establishments in Oklahoma
1998 disestablishments in Oklahoma